Room For Love is a chick lit novel by American author Andrea Meyer, inspired by an article the author wrote for the New York Post.

Plot 
The book focuses on 32-year-old Jacquie Stuart, an employee of a New York film magazine who is dissatisfied with various aspects of her life, especially her romantic situation. She pitches an idea for a feature article to the editor of a women's magazine, of answering "Roommate Wanted" advertisements as a way to meet potential partners. The novel follows Jacquie's ensuing experiences with the men she meets in this way.

References

External links 
Author website of Andrea Meyer
Book website of Room For Love 

2007 American novels
Novels set in New York City